This is a list of the leading try scorers in men's rugby union test matches. It includes players with a minimum of 30 test tries.

Try scorers
As of 12 March 2023

Bold denotes the player is still playing.
Italics denotes player is still playing, but not for a national team.

Notes

References

See also
 International rugby union player records
 List of leading rugby union drop goal scorers
 List of leading rugby union test point scorers
 List of rugby union test caps leaders

External links
Scrum.com

try    
Try scorers